Avi Buchsenbaum is a former Israeli footballer and manager who played 13 seasons in Hapoel Ramat Gan.

His son Omer is also a footballer who plays for Hapoel Ramat Gan.

References

1953 births
Living people
Israeli Jews
Israeli footballers
Israeli football managers
Hapoel Ramat Gan F.C. players
Hapoel Ramat Gan F.C. managers
Footballers from Ramat Gan
Association footballers not categorized by position